The following lists give the municipalities of Turkey within each province:

Municipalities and mayors